Thachur is a village in kallakurichi district in the state of Tamil Nadu, India.It is a Grama Panchayat consisting of few villages.

Reason for this Village Name

By Historical
Thachur was known as Thachanur or Tharasur. In olden days, Sculptures were stayed near by the Thachur Sivan temple. They supplied the god idols to nearby places. Hence it was called "Thachan oor" ( Sculpture's Place).One Idol made from this place taken to Lord Siva Temple. Tanjore.

By Myths
As per the Siva Puranam (Thiru Vilaiyadal - Thakshan), Lord Siva married Thakshan daughter Sakthi(Thakshayini). Thakshan planned to do a Yagna without inviting Lord Shiva (Son in Law). Lord Siva found it as an insult and refused Sakthi not to attend that Yagna. Sakthi Quarreled with Siva and came to Thakshanoor Kingdom. She met her father and asked him to invite his husband Siva. Thakshan refused her obligation. So Sakthi cursed him and demolished the Yagna and fell in to the yaga gunda and immolished her body.From Yaga Gunda, Lord Siva took her body to Kailash. Lord Siva got wild and started dancing "Ukira Thandavam".Seeing this Lord Vishnu thrown his Chakra and cut Sakthi body into few more pieces. The places, where Sakthi body fallen all became "Sakthi Peedam". Remaining of the body Lord Siva buried it in Kasi (Varanasi).
After that Lord Siva convinced her by offering half part of his body (i.e. Artha Nareswar) to teach the man and woman equality to this world. Sakthi rebirth again in Varanasi as "Visalakshi" and Lord Siva as "Viswanathar".He married Visalakshi at Varanasi kingdom.
This Purana goes on like this....

Demographics
 India census, Thachur had a population of 3675. Males and females each constitute 50% of the population. Thachur has an average literacy rate of 54%, higher than the national average of 39.5%: male literacy is 51% and female literacy is 49%. In Thachur, 11% of the population is under 6 years of age. Kallakurichi is the Taluk headquarters of this village.

Climate
The temperature is moderate; the maximum and minimum temperatures being 37 °C and 20 °C respectively. The town gets its rainfall from the northeast monsoon in winter and the southwest monsoon in summer. The average annual rainfall is 1070 mm.

Economy
Agriculture is the backbone of this Village.  People from various district, settled down here as farmers. Milk Product is the prime source from this village. Sugarcane cultivation is also prevalent in this area. Kallakurichi is also known as "Sugar City" as there are two major sugar factories.

Schools in Thachur
"Govt. Middle school",Thachur Kai Kaati
"Oxalis International school"
"Govt. Elemanary school",Thachur
"Bharathi matric hr sec school" Thachur Kai kaati

Colleges in Thachur
"Bharathi College", Thachur
"Modern ITI", Thachur
"JTV Community College", Thachur
"Lakshmi arts college", Bangaram
"Jain Engineering college", Eravar
"Shanmuga Arts College", Indili
"Muruga Polytechnic College", Indili
SVS Siddha & Auyurvedic College, Indili

Government Offices in Thachur
Deputy Superintendent of Police Office, Thachur 
District Horticulture Office, Thachur
District Agricultural office, Thachur
District Agricultural Engineering Equipment Office, Thachur
Tamil Nadu Food Corporation Godown, Thachur
TNEB,Thachur
BSNL, Thachur Phone Code : 04151
Milk co-operative Society,Thachur
VAO Office, Thachur
Sub Post Office, Thachur Pin Code :606213
Ration Shop, Thachur
Forest Ranger Office, Indili
Revenue Inspector Office, Indili
Taluk Office,Kallakurichi
District collector Office,Kallakurichi

Nearest Hospitals

Government Hospitals
Govt.Primary Health Center, Melur  (3 km)
Health Sub center, Thachur
District Government Hospital,Kallakurichi
Medical College Hospital,Kallakurichi (5 km)

Private Hospitals
Siddha clinic, Thachur
Pullayee Siddha Clinic,Thachur
Lotus Hospital, Emaper
Sanjeevi Hospital, Kallakurichi
AMC Hospital, Kallakurichi

Medical Shops
Medical shop,Thachur
Central Govt Makkal Marunthagam, Emaper

Banking
India ATM, Thachur Kai kaati
Federal Bank, Anna Nagar, Kallakurichi
Punjab National Bank, Kallakurichi

Nearest Petrol Bunks
Thachur (Salem By Pass)
Indian oil, Emaper
Kallakurichi
Neelamangalam

Markets
24 Hrs Backery
Sunday Non Vegetarian market

Worship Places

Temples in Thachur
"Amirtha kandeswarar Aalayam" a Lord siva temple, Thachur 
"Periyayee kovil", Thachur
"Amman temple", Thachur kaikaatti
Artha Nariswarar Temple, Ulagankathaan
"Veera Payangaram temple" Veera Payangaram
"Lord shiva temple", Ulakiya nallur
"Panjaliyamman Temple"Thachur
"Madurai veeran Karai",Thachur
Ayyanar kovil

Churches in Thachur
"Pathuvai Anthoniar Church", Thachur
"Babtist church", Porpadakurichi
"St.Joseph church", Ulagankathan
"Jebamalai Annai church", Kallakurichi
St.Antony Church (Basilica), Mel Nariyappanoor(20 km)

Mosque
Highway Mosque, Thachur crosscut road

Transportation
Share Autos / Autos
Private Town Buses (Kallakurichi to Siruvathur, To Vaanavaretty, To Thottiyam)
Govt. Town Buses (Kallakurichi to Chinnasalem,To Melnariyappanoor, To Ammakalathoor, To Thalaivaasal,To Melur,To Koogaiyoor, To Ulagiyanalloor,To Ulagangkaathan,To Nainaar Palayam..)
Route Buses (Chinna salem, Attur.. Few stopped at Emaper By Pass Roundana)

Bus Stops
Thachur Kai Katti (Thachur Cross cut Road),  Emaper By pass Roundana, Panan Salai, Gandhi nagar, Pazha thottam, Anthoniyar kovil,Sivan kovi stops...

Nearest Railway Stations

Stations
Siruvathur (2 km)
Chinna Salem.(14.5 km)

Railway Junctions
Attur (48 km)
Salem(104 km)
Vridhachalam(60 km)
Trichy (140 km)
Chennai (246 km)

Nearest Airport
Salem
Trichy
Chennai International Airport
Ulundurepet (Helipad). (35 km)

Nearest Tourist / Shrine Places
Veerangi Aiyanaar Kovil, Veerapayangaram(30 km)
Pazhamalai nathar kovil, Vridhachalam
Chinna Thirupathi,Naranampattu (54 km)
St.Antony Church, Melnariyappanoor(20 km)
Gomukhi Dam
Vellimalai (Monkey falls)

Water Sources

For Drinking Purpose
Common Wells - 1
Water Tanks - 2
Borewells - 4
Water Barrels -6

For Agricultural
Lakes -3 ( Periyeri, Rathina Muthu Maari Ammam Eri, Emaper Eri)
Ponds -2 (Saalavaai kuttai, Pazhathotta kulam,Sivan kovil Potraamarai kulam,Mariamman kovil kulam)
Gomukhi dam, Kachirayapalayam

References

Villages in Kallakurichi district